This is a list of the 21 members of the European Parliament for Belgium in the 2014 to 2019 session.

List

Party representation

Notes

Belgium
2014
List